Dominik Britsch (born 21 October 1987) is a German professional boxer. He is last EBU-EU (European Union) middleweight title, and is vacant Germany BDB middleweight champion.

Professional boxing record

|style="text-align:center;" colspan="9"|35 fights, 32 wins (11 knockouts), 3 losses, 1 draw,  0 NC
|-style="text-align:center; background:#e3e3e3;"
|style="border-style:none none solid solid; "|
|style="border-style:none none solid solid; "|Result
|style="border-style:none none solid solid; "|Record
|style="border-style:none none solid solid; "|Opponent
|style="border-style:none none solid solid; "|Type
|style="border-style:none none solid solid; "|Rd., Time
|style="border-style:none none solid solid; "|Date
|style="border-style:none none solid solid; "|Location
|style="border-style:none none solid solid; "|Notes
|-align=center
|36
|Loss
|32–3–1
|align=left| Julio César Chávez Jr.
|UD
|10
|10 Dec 2016
|align=left|
|align=left|
|-
|-align=center
|35
|Win
|32–2–1
|align=left| Slavisa Simeunovic
|UD
|8
|27 Feb 2016
|align=left|
|align=left|
|-align=center

References

External links
 

1987 births
Living people
German male boxers
Super-middleweight boxers